The Sendai Girls Tag Team Championship is a professional wrestling world tag team championship owned by the Sendai Girls' Pro Wrestling. The title was introduced on September 17, 2011, and the inaugural champions were crowned on October 11, 2015, when the Jumboni Sisters (Dash Chisako and Sendai Sachiko) defeated Kyoko Kimura and Takumi Iroha.

Like most professional wrestling championships, the title is won as a result of a scripted match. There have been sixteen reigns shared among twelve teams, seventeen distinctive wrestlers and three vacancies. The current champions are Team 200kg (Chihiro Hashimoto and Yuu) who are in their third reign as a team.

Reigns

Combined reigns 

By team

By wrestler

References

External links 
Sendai Girls' Pro Wrestling official site, in Japanese

Women's professional wrestling tag team championships